The Hit List is the seventh album by the San Diego-based rock band Unwritten Law, released on January 2, 2007 by Abydos Records. It is a "best of" album that includes 3 songs from their 2005 album Here's to the Mourning, new studio recordings of 14 songs from their earlier albums, and the new songs "Shoulda Known Better" and "Welcome to Oblivion." The earlier songs were all re-recorded by the current lineup of the band, and some differ significantly from the original recordings, reflecting changes in the band's lineup and musical style over the years.

This was the last release by the band to feature drummer Tony Palermo, who left in March 2008 to join Papa Roach.

Track listing

Personnel

Band
Scott Russo - lead vocals, rhythm guitar
Steve Morris - lead guitar, backing vocals
Pat "PK" Kim - bass guitar, backing vocals
Tony Palermo - drums

Additional musicians
Mickey Avalon - backing vocals on "Shoulda Known Better", lead vocals on "Shoulda Known Better" (Mickey Avalon version)
Adrian Young – drums on "Celebration Song"

Production
Sean Bevan – producer, recording engineer (tracks 1, 2, 4, 5, 7, and 20), mix engineer
Josh Abraham – producer of "Celebration Song" (with Beavan)
Linda Perry – producer of "Save Me (Wake Up Call)" (with Beavan)
Critter and Zach Barnhorst – recording engineers (tracks 2, 4, and 5)
Chris Baseford and Scott Humphrey – recording engineers (tracks 3, 6, and 8-19)
Greg Collins – additional recording on "Welcome to Oblivion"
Tom Lord-Alge – mixing of "Shoulda Known Better"
Brian Gardner – mastering

Artwork
Pat Kim and Bonifacio – artwork and design

Chart positions

Unwritten Law albums
2007 greatest hits albums